Maarten Kossmann (born 5 February 1966 in Zuidlaren, Netherlands) is a Dutch linguist who specializes in Berber languages. He is currently professor of Berber studies at Leiden University.

Bibliography 

1997. Grammaire du parler berbère de Figuig (Maroc oriental).
1999. Essai sur la phonologie historique du berbère.
2000. A Study of Eastern Moroccan Fairy Tales.
2010. Parallel System Borrowing: Parallel morphological systems due to the borrowing of paradigms.
2011. A Grammar of Ayer Tuareg (Niger). 
2013. The Arabic Influence on Northern Berber.
2014. On substratum: The history of the focus marker d in Jijel Arabic (Algeria). In: Carole de Féral, Maarten Kossmann & Mauro Tosco (eds.), In and Out of Africa. Languages in question. In honour of Robert Nicolaï. Volume 2. Language Contact and Language Change in Africa.

References 

1966 births
Linguists from the Netherlands
Berberologists
Living people
Academic staff of Leiden University
People from Zuidlaren